Michael "Mike" Scarola (born January 26, 1976 in Halifax, Nova Scotia) is a Canadian sprint canoer and marathon canoeist who competed in the early 2000s. He won a bronze medal in the C-2 1000 m event at the 2002 ICF Canoe Sprint World Championships in Seville, Spain and also won a silver medal in C-2 (canoe doubles) at the ICF World Marathon Canoe Kayak Championships in Dartmouth, Nova Scotia in 2000.  Mike also finished sixth in the C-2 1000 m event at the 2004 Summer Olympics in Athens.  Mike was a member of Canada's Senior National Sprint Canoe Kayak Team for 7 years.

Following his athletic career, Mike joined the Royal Bank of Canada where he held various positions including working in Investment Banking in Toronto with RBC Capital Markets since 2007.

References

Sports-reference.com profile

1976 births
Canadian male canoeists
Canadian people of Italian descent
Canoeists at the 2004 Summer Olympics
Dalhousie University alumni
Living people
Olympic canoeists of Canada
Sportspeople from Halifax, Nova Scotia
ICF Canoe Sprint World Championships medalists in Canadian